Flag of the Virgin Islands can mean:
 Flag of the British Virgin Islands
 Flag of the United States Virgin Islands